Moeka (written: 萌花 or 萌華) is a feminine Japanese given name. Notable people with the name include:

, Japanese professional wrestler, gravure idol, voice actress and television and radio personality
, Japanese women's footballer
,  Japanese actress
, Japanese competitor in synchronised swimming

Fictional characters
, a character in the visual novel Steins;Gate

Japanese feminine given names